William M. Valentine (born 1971/1972) is an American politician. He is a member for the Maryland House of Delegates in District 2A in Washington and Frederick counties. He was previously a candidate for the Frederick County Council in 2018.

Background
Valentine graduated from Delone Catholic High School in 1989. He later attended Frederick Community College, where he earned an Bachelor's degree in criminal justice in 1991. He is a retired police officer, ending his career as a lieutenant in the Westminster Police Department. Prior to serving in the legislature, he worked as an investigator with the Frederick County State's Attorney's office.

In 2022, Valentine ran for the Maryland House of Delegates in District 4, seeking to succeed outgoing state Delegate Dan Cox, who unsuccessfully ran for governor in 2022. He was later redrawn into District 2A. He won the Republican primary election with 22.9 percent of the vote, placing second behind incumbent state delegate William J. Wivell. He faced no formal opposition in the general election.

In the legislature
Valentine was sworn into the Maryland House of Delegates on January 11, 2023. He is a member of the House Judiciary Committee.

Political positions
During his 2022 House of Delegates campaign, Valentine ran on a platform that included advocating for limited state government, supporting law enforcement, limiting taxes, preserving natural resources, and defending the Second Amendment. He also supports tougher sentences for violent criminals and people who commit handgun violations.

Electoral history

References

External links
 

21st-century American politicians
1970s births
Living people
Year of birth uncertain
People from Gettysburg, Pennsylvania
Republican Party members of the Maryland House of Delegates